A Coruña is a city and municipality of Galicia, Spain.

A Coruña, La Coruña or Coruña may also refer to:

Province of A Coruña, a province in Galicia, Spain
A Coruña metropolitan area, the metropolitan area that surrounds A Coruña
A Coruña (comarca), a comarca in the Province of A Coruña, Galicia, Spain
Coruña del Conde, a village and municipality in the southern province of Burgos, Castile and León Spain
A Coruña Airport,  the airport serving the Galician city of A Coruña, Galicia, Spain
A Coruña (Spanish Congress Electoral District), one of the 52 electoral districts used for the Spanish Congress of Deputies
University of A Coruña, a public university located in the city of A Coruña, Galicia, Spain
Coliseum da Coruña, a stadium for concerts and shows used in A Coruña, Galicia, Spain
Port of A Coruña, a port in A Coruña, Spain, on the Atlantic Ocean
Coruña, a mountain in the region of Tacna, Peru

Sport
Deportivo de La Coruña, a Spanish professional football club based in the city of A Coruña, Galicia, Spain
Deportivo de La Coruña B, the reserve team of Real Club Deportivo de La Coruña
CB Coruña, a professional basketball team based in A Coruña, Galicia, Spain
HC Liceo La Coruña, a rink hockey club based in A Coruña, Galicia, Spain
Deportivo La Coruña Brasil Futebol Clube, a Brazilian football club based in Rio de Janeiro, Rio de Janeiro state

See also
Corunna (disambiguation)